Hala Azoty is an indoor arena in Kędzierzyn-Koźle, Poland.

The hall was opened on 20 May 2005, during the friendly match Poland – Slovakia.

References

External links
 Official site (Polish)

Indoor arenas in Poland
Volleyball venues in Poland
Buildings and structures in Kędzierzyn-Koźle